SeaLand, a division of the Maersk Group, is an American intra-regional container shipping company headquartered in Miramar, Florida with representation in 29 countries across the Americas. The company offers ocean and intermodal services using container ships, trucks, and rail serving customers between North and South America, Central America, and the Caribbean.

History
The original SeaLand was founded by Malcom McLean, an American trucking entrepreneur who revolutionized the shipping industry by packing goods in uniform containers (containerization) which could be transported quickly and seamlessly between different modes of transportation. This process offered companies significant time and cost savings that facilitated distribution and expanded international trade.

On April 26, 1956, McLean introduced the world's first container ship, which sailed from Newark, New Jersey to Houston, Texas with 58 aluminum trailers (containers) on its deck.

In April 1960, the company name was changed from Pan-Atlantic Steamship Corporation to SeaLand Service, Inc., an American international shipping company.

From 1967 to 1973, SeaLand became notable for delivering 1,200 containers a month to the Indochina peninsula during the Vietnam War, resulting in $450 million in revenues from the U.S. Defense Department.

From January 1969 to 1999, SeaLand was owned by R.J. Reynolds Co., CSX Corporation and others.

Recent history
In March 1999, CSX separated SeaLand into three entities: an international shipping company, a domestic shipping company, and a terminal operator.

In December 1999, Maersk Line's parent company A.P. Moller – Maersk acquired the international container shipping business while retaining the SeaLand name.

In 2000, Maersk Line changed its commercial name globally to "Maersk SeaLand" as a result of SeaLand’s acquisition in the previous year.

In 2003, the Carlisle Group bought the domestic shipping line from CSX and changed the name to Horizon Lines.

In 2006, the commercial name SeaLand ceased to exist when the then-known "Maersk SeaLand", changed its name to "Maersk Line" after the purchase of Royal P&O Nedlloyd.

In January 2014, due to the strong brand recognition throughout the intra-Americas region, the Maersk Group announced the revival of the SeaLand brand as a specialized intra-regional carrier, taking over the existing Maersk Line network for intra-Americas trade starting January 2015.

In January 2015, SeaLand started operations as the standalone carrier of the Americas for Maersk Group.

In 2017, the corporate historian for A.P. Moller-Maersk in Copenhagen commissioned a former employee to catalog the historical archives of Sea-Land Service. The archive had been created at the time of Maersk’s acquisition of Sea-Land Service in December 1999. The archived materials were collected and sequestered in Maersk’s Charlotte, North Carolina office that had been Sea-Land’s global headquarters.

The archives consisted of business documents, marketing materials, photo collections, internal communications, newsletters, videos, speech transcripts, etc. going back to McLean Trucking, owned by Malcom McLean, the founder of Sea-Land Service. It included diagrams of McLean’s original idea of loading trailers into vessel cargo holds. The idea of loading removable boxes (containers) onto ships was a refinement of his original concept.

The archives were donated to the United States Merchant Marine Academy Museum in Kings Point, New York.

Management
In 2014, Craig Mygatt was named CEO of SeaLand. Others joining the former Maersk Line veteran on the executive management team include:
 Shane Sawyer - Chief Financial Officer
 Todd Pigeon - Chief Commercial Officer
 Tim Child - Chief Operations Officer
 Thiago Covre - Chief Line Officer
 Don Francey - Head of Key Clients

References

External links
Historia de Sea-Land via www.mgar.net
Containers: The Early Years , Some Personal reminiscences of Thomas A. Ewig, Chairman/CEO, Martec International via container50.org.uk
The Rise of Maritime Containerization in the Port of Oakland 1950 to 1970 , Author: Mark Rosenstein via www.apparent-wind.com
History of Sea-Land, CSX Lines, and Horizon Lines Timeline (1956-Present) via www.horizon-lines.com
List of largest container shipping companies

Container shipping companies
Transatlantic shipping companies
Container shipping companies of the United States
American companies established in 1960
Transport companies established in 1960
Maersk